The list of sovereign states and dependent territories by continent data file is a plain text format describing the list of countries by continent, suitable for automated processing.

Format

Data file
Note: This data was compiled by hand and may contain mistakes. One small modification is that the various "insular areas of the United States" listed above are recorded here as the single "United States Minor Outlying Islands" in Oceania.

See also
 List of sovereign states and dependent territories by continent
 List of countries and capitals in native languages
 List of national capitals
 Gallery of sovereign state flags
 Gallery of dependent territory flags

References

External links
 UN List of Territories
 CIA – The World Factbook
 European Commission: List of countries, territories and currencies
 Administrative Divisions of Countries ("Statoids")

Data file
States (data file), list